Karl Ludwig Sand (Wunsiedel, Upper Franconia (then in Prussia), 5 October 1795 – Mannheim, 20 May 1820) was a German university student and member of a liberal Burschenschaft (student association). He was executed in 1820 for the murder of the conservative dramatist August von Kotzebue the previous year in Mannheim. As a result of his execution, Sand became a martyr in the eyes of many German nationalists seeking the creation of a united German national state.

Biography
Karl Ludwig Sand was born to Gottfried Christoph Sand and his wife Dorothea Johanna Wilhelmina Schöpf (1766–1826), on 5 October 1795. His siblings were George, Fritz, Caroline and Julia.

Education

In 1804 he attended the Lateinschule (Latin school) in Wunsiedel and in 1810 he moved on to the grammar school (Gymnasium) in Hof, living with the school's rector, Georg Heinrich Saalfrank, a friend of Sand's Enlightened Protestant family. Following the closure of the Hof Gymnasium on the institution of Montgelas's Reforms, Sand followed his teacher to the Neues Gymnasium (New Grammar School) in Regensburg, completing his studies in September 1814. In November 1814 Sand matriculated at the University of Tübingen.

In 1815, Sand volunteered under Major von Falkenhausen, participating in the Battle of Waterloo in June and in Paris by July. He returned from the war disillusioned with its results and fell into a deep depression. In 1816, while at the University of Erlangen, Sand formed Burschenschaft Teutonia with his friend Dittmar, meeting at castle ruins near Erlangen which they had named Ruttli. They built a meeting house for their group of 80 students. Sand's depression was further intensified by the destruction of Ruttli by the competing political group the Landmannschaft and the drowning death of Dittmar in 1817. Starting in 1817 he studied at the University of Jena, attending the lectures of Jakob Friedrich Fries, Heinrich Luden and Lorenz Oken and joining further Burschenschaften. Sand was among the nationalist students who gathered at the 1817 Wartburg festival, in which Kotzebue's History of the German Empires was one of the books ceremoniously burned.

Murder of August von Kotzebue

Sand already contemplated the murder of August von Kotzebue in a diary entry of 5 May 1818. He called him a "traitor to the nation" and a "deceiver of the people" and characterized him as an enemy of the Burschenschaft.

On the morning of 23 March 1819 Sand, using the pseudonym Henry, visited Kotzebue in his Mannheim house. Refused entry to the house and told to return in the afternoon, Sand returned just before five o'clock. Having exchanged just a few words with Kotzebue, Sand produced a dagger and, with the words "Here, you traitor to the fatherland!", stabbed him repeatedly in the chest. Surprised by Kotzebue's four-year-old son witnessing the event from the nursery, Sand lost his wits and stabbed himself. Leaving the house, he handed a servant a piece of writing he had prepared ("Death to August von Kotzebue"), and stabbed himself again in the street. His suicide attempt failed, and he was taken to hospital.

Aftermath
The Mannheim Hofgericht (court of law) sentenced Sand to death on 5 May 1820. He was beheaded by Franz Wilhelm Widmann, who was the official executioner at the time.

Sand's murder of Kotzebue was a catalyst for government restrictions on liberal and German nationalist thought. On 20 September 1819 Prince Klemens Wenzel von Metternich called a meeting of representatives from across the German Confederation to create the Carlsbad Decrees which outlawed the Burschenschaften and put limits on freedom of the press and the rights of members of such organizations, banning them from public office, teaching or studying at universities.

Alexandre Dumas, père wrote about Sand's life and published excerpts from his journals and letters in Karl Ludwig Sand, part of Celebrated Crimes. Prior to writing his story, Dumas visited Widmann's son in Mannheim in 1838 to gather information about Sand's character. Alexander Pushkin also memorialized Sand in his poem about assassins entitled "Kinzhal" (The Dagger). In Germany three films have been made concerning the events of Karl Sand's life: Karl Sand in 1964, Sand in 1971, and Die Unbedingten in 2009.

Writings
 Gründung einer allgemeinen freien Burschenschaft, 1817
 Teutsche Jugend an die teutsche Menge, zum 18. October 1818
 Todesstoß dem August von Kotzebue, 1818/19, published posthumously.

References

Further reading
Friedrich Wilhelm Carové: Ueber die Ermordung Kotzebue’s. Eisenach 1819
Authentischer Bericht über die Ermordung des Kaiserlich-Russischen Staatsraths Herrn August von Kotzebue; nebst vielen interessanten Notizen über ihn und über Carl Sand, den Meuchelmörder. Mannheim 1819 (Nachdruck Berlin 1999, hg. v. Antonia Meiners)
Die wichtigsten Lebensmomente Karl Ludwig Sand’s aus Wunsiedel. Nürnberg 1819
Nachtrag zu den wichtigsten Lebensmomenten Karl Ludwig Sand’s aus Wunsiedel mit der vollständigen Erzählung seiner Hinrichtung am 20. Mai 1820. Nürnberg 1820
Ausführliche Darstellung von Karl Ludwig Sand’s letzten Tagen und Augenblicken. Stuttgart 1820
Charles-Louis Sand. Mémoires avec le récit des circonstances qui ont accompagné l’assassinat d’Auguste de Kotzebue, et une justification des universités d’Allemagne. Trad. de l’anglais, Paris 1819
[Karl Levin] von Hohnhorst (Hrsg.): Vollständige Uebersicht der gegen Carl Ludwig Sand wegen Meuchelmordes verübt an dem K[aiserlich]. Russischen Staatsrath v. Kotzebue geführten Untersuchung. Aus den Originalakten ausgezogen, geordnet und hrsg., 2 Abthn., Stuttgart, Tübingen 1820
Carl Courtin: Carl Ludwig Sand’s letzte Lebenstage und Hinrichtung. Geschichtlich dargestellt. Franckenthal 1821
[Robert Wesselhöft]: Carl Ludwig Sand. Dargestellt durch seine Tagebücher und Briefe von einigen seiner Freunde. Altenburg 1821
Noch acht Beitraege zur Geschichte August von Kotzebues und C. L. Sands. Aus öffentlichen Nachrichten zusammengestellt. Mühlhausen 1821
Friedrich Cramer (Hrsg.): Acten-Auszüge aus dem Untersuchungs-Process über Carl Ludwig Sand; nebst anderen Materialien zur Beurtheilung desselben und August von Kotzebue. Altenburg, Leipzig 1821
Sand [Zu Kotzebues und Sands Tat], o. J., [um 1820], Sammelband (ohne Titelblatt, vielleicht „Actenmäßige Untersuchung ... des Falles Sand“ 1820/21, Flugschriften), darin: 1. Die Bildung des Zeitgeistes, 2. August von Kotzebue nach der Geschichte seiner Schrift „Bahrst mit der eisernen Stirne“, 3. August von Kotzebues Autorenverhältnisse, 4. Kotzebues politisch-literarische Bulletins 1818, 5. Sand’s That nach dem Acten-Inhalt, 6. Sand’s Zustand nach der That, 7. Actenmäßige Notizen über Sand’s Person und frühere Lebensgeschichte, 8. Sand’s Gesinnungen über und gegen August von Kotzebue, 9. Sandische Aufsätze: Todesstoß und das Todesurteil über Kotzebue, 10. Sands Verhältnisse zu Andern, zur Burschenschaft, zu einem lit. Verein, zum Turnwesen u. dgl., 11. Sand über sich selbst, seine Grundansichten, seine That, nebst Urtheilen Anderer über ihn, 12. Gerichtliche Vertheidigung für Sand. Urtheilsgründe als Bericht
C. T. Riedel: Galerie der Verbrecher, Bd. 3: Sand, Louvel, Grandission, Ponterie, Damiens, Low, Angiolino, Sondershausen. Nordhausen 1822
C[arl]. E[rnst]. Jarcke: Carl Ludwig Sand und sein an dem kaiserlich-russischen Staatsrath v. Kotzebue verübter Mord. Eine psychologisch-criminalistische Erörterung aus der Geschichte unserer Zeit. Neue, aus ungedruckten Quellen vermehrte Bearbeitung. Berlin 1831
Friedrich Münch: Follen, Sand und Löning. Neues Licht in altes Dunkel. Aus den Erinnerungen von Friedrich Münch. In: Die Gartenlaube. 20/44/1872, S. 722–725
Julius Busch: Karl Ludwig Sand. Nach einem am 7. April 1902 im Altertumsverein gehaltenen Vortrag. In: Mannheimer Geschichtsblätter. 20/1–3/1919, S. 3–11
Karl Alexander von Müller: Karl Ludwig Sand. München 1923, 2. Aufl. 1925
Max Doblinger: Tagebucheintragungen des Erzherzogs Johann, des späteren Reichsverwesers, über Karl Ludwig Sand und die Karlsbader Beschlüsse. In: Herman Haupt (Hrsg.): Quellen und Darstellungen zur Geschichte der Burschenschaft und der deutschen Einheitsbewegung. Bd. 8, Heidelberg 1925, 2. Aufl. 1966, S. 151–153
Heinrich von Stein, Reinhard Buchwald: Karl Ludwig Sand Scherer 1947
Ernst Cyriaci: Die Coburger Familie von Sand 1275–1940. Coburg 1941 [überarbeitet und verbessert 1970 ff., Manuskript im Stadtarchiv Coburg]
Peter Brückner: „Bewahre uns Gott in Deutschland vor irgendeiner Revolution!“ Die Ermordung des Staatsrats von Kotzebue durch den Studenten Sand. Berlin 1975, 2. Aufl. 1978 (Wagenbachs Taschenbücherei, Bd. 6). 
Ernst Wilhelm Wreden: Karl Ludwig Sand – „Mörder aus Vaterlandsliebe“. Eine biographische Skizze. In: Horst Bernhardi, Ernst Wilhelm Wreden (Hrsg.): Jahresgabe der Gesellschaft für burschenschaftliche Geschichtsforschung 1975. o. O. 1975, S. 5–7
Ernst Abbühl: Karl Ludwig Sand. Sein Bild in der historischen Forschung und in der Literatur. Eine vergleichende Analyse. Diss. phil. masch., Bern 1978
Günther Heydemann: Carl Ludwig Sand. Die Tat als Attentat. Hof 1985 (Oberfränkische Köpfe, [Bd. 3]). 
Günther Heydemann: Der Attentäter Carl Ludwig Sand. 20 Briefe und Dokumente aus den Erlanger und Jenaer Studienjahren. In: Christian Hünemörder (Hrsg.): Darstellungen und Quellen zur Geschichte der deutschen Einheitsbewegung im neunzehnten und zwanzigsten Jahrhundert. Bd. 12, Heidelberg 1986, S. 7–77
Renate Lotz: Bildnis und Erinnerung – Carl Sand. Ausstellung 3. April–31. Oktober 1985. Fichtelgebirgsmuseum Wunsiedel, Wunsiedel 1985 (Begleitheft zu Ausstellungen des Fichtelgebirgsmuseums, Heft 2)
Hagen Schulze: Sand, Kotzebue und das Blut des Verräters. In: Alexander Demandt (Hrsg.): Das Attentat in der Geschichte. Köln 1996, S. 215–233
Harald Neumann: Carl Ludwig Sand. Theologiestudent und Attentäter. Wissenschaft & Praxis,  Berlin 1997. 
Klaus Beyersdorf: Der Burschenschafter und Kotzebue-Attentäter Karl Ludwig Sand 1795–1820. Ein Mitglied der alten Coburger Familie von Sand. In: Coburger Geschichtsblätter. 6/3/1998, S. 87–90
Antonia Meiners (Hrsg.): Authentischer Bericht über die Ermordung des Kaiserlich-Russischen Staatsraths Herrn August von Kotzebue. Berliner Handpresse, Berlin 1999. Nachdr. der Ausg. Mannheim 1819
George S. Williamson. What Killed August von Kotzebue? The Temptations of Virtue and the Political Theology of German Nationalism, 1789-1819, in The Journal of Modern History (2000).
Sabine Bayerl (Hrsg.): Authentischer Bericht über die Ermordung des Kaiserlich-Russischen Staatsraths Herrn August von Kotzebue. Universitätsverlag Winter, Heidelberg 2005. Beigefügt: Acten-Auszüge aus dem Untersuchungs-Process über Carl Ludwig Sand. Nachdr. der 2. Aufl. Mannheim 1819 sowie Altenburg 1821. 

1795 births
1820 deaths
People from Wunsiedel
German people convicted of murder
19th-century executions by Germany
People executed for murder
People convicted of murder by Germany
Executed people from Bavaria
People executed by Germany by decapitation
Executed students